= Punjabi Cinema Golden Honours =

- Location: India
- Presenter: Punjabi Canvas
- Description: World's first mega event in honour of great Punjabi cinema

Punjabi Cinema Golden Honors is a film festival held in celebration of the heritage of Punjabi film and its entertainment industry. It works towards honoring the artists who have helped the industry reach its current heights, and aims to create a common platform where legends, present stars, and future artists can come together and share the same space. Ratish Gupta is the founder of Punjabi Cinema Golden Honors & Film Festival.

== Concept ==
The event includes a seminar to be conducted with a panel of experts from the industry and the media on the growth and technical advancement of Punjabi cinema. A screening of Punjabi short films and documentaries will be held to attract a greater audience for the genre. There is also a celebration night with the intention of honoring the veterans and contemporary stars who have dedicated their lives to Punjabi cinema.

== Content ==
The Punjabi Cinema Golden Honors is an occasion to celebrate Punjabi films and artists who have dedicated their lives to the growth of the industry. Its creators aim to promote both mainstream and parallel Punjabi cinema. The work of new and upcoming filmmakers will also be showcased, along with documentaries made in the Punjabi language.

Its organizers state that they wish to honour the people who have contributed to the success and development of Punjabi cinema and helped the industry scale its current heights. They wish to educate their local audience about the rich heritage and legacy of Punjabi cinema so that they can feel proud of being associated with the cinema of their region and the journey of its success.

== Film festival ==
It is the first event in the history of Punjabi cinema which promotes and showcases the work of fresh talent. The selection of work exhibited is at the sole discretion of the panel headed by eminent personalities of the industry. In addition to this, its organizers held a symposium on Punjabi cinema where fans of the media industry personalities and cinema students could share a discussion platform.
